Ultra-imperialism, or occasionally hyperimperialism and formerly super-imperialism, is a potential, comparatively peaceful phase of capitalism, meaning after or beyond imperialism. It was described mainly by Karl Kautsky. Post-imperialism is sometimes used as a synonym of ultra-imperialism, although it can have distinct meanings.

Origin of the term 
The suggestion of a possible ultra-imperialism is normally attributed to Karl Kautsky, the leading theoretician of the Social Democratic Party of Germany (SPD) in the era of Imperial Germany. Kautsky coined the term in 1914, but he had speculated on the issue several times in 1912 already. He postulated that in the field of international relations a "stage [approaches], in which the competition among states will be disabled by their cartel relationship". Thus, Kautsky’s ultra-imperialism concept was shaped by the idea of cartels made up by states for the purpose of international policy.

However, the basic idea of a possible pacification of imperialism did not really originate from Kautsky. The British left-liberal John Atkinson Hobson had written in 1902 in a similar context about a potential inter-imperialism which could be established by a combination of great powers (combination or combine then being used to designate cartels). In 1907, Karl Liebknecht stated in his brochure Militarismus und Antimilitarismus that "a trustification of all actual and potential colonies among the colonial powers, so to speak, […] a disabling of the colonial rivalry among the states [could take place in the future], as it occurred to some extent for the private competition among capitalist entrepreneurs in the cartels and trusts". On the eve of World War I, these peace-loving social-democrats and liberals in Europe hoped that the great powers—beginning with the British Empire and the German Reich—would unite into a states' cartel or a combination of states giving the rivals organization and reconciliation.

Karl Kautsky's statements in 1914 
In 1914, Kautsky published an article on imperialism which subsequently was translated into English and published in the United States. In these, he argued there could be a way out of direful wars among the imperialist powers, a solution now named ultra-imperialism or super-imperialism.

Kautsky elucidated this thought in the September 1914 issue of Die Neue Zeit. He described the current phase of capitalism as imperialism. In Marxist theory, imperialism consists of capitalist states superexploiting labour in agrarian regions in order to increase both the imperialist nation's productivity and their market. However, imperialism also required capitalist states to introduce protectionist measures and to defend their empires militarily. He believed that this was the ultimate cause of World War I.

Kautsky noted that before the war while industrial accumulation had continued, exports had dropped as a result of a tendency of industry to expand out of proportion to agriculture. He pointed out that growing nationalism in the more industrially advanced colonies would necessitate a continuation of the arms race after the war and that should this occur, economic stagnation would worsen.

In Kautsky's view, the only one way in which capitalists would be able to maintain the basic system while avoiding this stagnation would be for the wealthiest nations to form a cartel in the same manner as which banks had co-operated, agreeing to limit their competition and renounce their arms race in order to maintain their export markets and their systems of superexploitation. In doing so, he postulated that war and militarism were not essential features of capitalism and that a peaceful capitalism was possible.

Vladimir Lenin's criticism
Vladimir Lenin disagreed with Kautsky's approach. In an introduction to Nikolai Bukharin's Imperialism and World Economy written in 1916, he conceded that "in the abstract one can think of such a phase. In practice, however, he who denies the sharp tasks of to-day in the name of dreams about soft tasks of the future becomes an opportunist".

Lenin developed Bukharin's theories of imperialism and his own arguments formed the core of his work Imperialism: The Highest Stage of Capitalism. He wrote that Kautsky's theory supposed "the rule of finance capital lessens the unevenness and contradictions inherent in the world economy, whereas in reality it increases them". He gives examples of disparities in the international economy and discusses how they would develop even under a system of ultra-imperialism. He asks under the prevailing system "what means other than war could there be under capitalism to overcome the disparity between the development of productive forces and the accumulation of capital on the one side, and the division of colonies and spheres of influence for finance capital on the other?"

Recent positions on the idea of ultraimperialism 
Some Marxists have pointed out similarities between the co-operation between the capitalist states during the Cold War and ultra-imperialism. Martin Thomas of Trotskyist Workers Liberty points out that "since the collapse of the Stalinist bloc in 1989-91, that 'ultra-imperialism' has extended to cover almost the whole globe". Thomas goes on to say that it is not simply “a sharply polarised world of industrial states on one side, agrarian states on the other, with the industrial states joining together to keep the agrarian states un-industrial by force”. Rather, “it is a very unequal but multifarious system, with political independence for the ex-colonies, rapidly-permuting new international divisions of labour, and many poorer states exporting mostly manufactured goods".

Opponents of the theory of ultra-imperialism argue that whatever similar forms may have existed during the Cold War, since its end inter-capitalist competition has tended to increase  and that the nature of capitalism makes it impossible for capitalists to make conscious decisions to avoid behaviour if in the short term it proves beneficial.

Related theories 
State cartel theory, a new concept in the field of international relations theory, uses the basic conception of Kautsky's ultra-imperialism, but it is not a Marxist theory.

See also 
 Military–industrial complex
 New Imperialism
 Permanent war economy
 World-systems theory

References

Literature 
 Karl Kautsky, "Der Imperialismus," Die Neue Zeit, 11 September 1914; 32 (1914), Vol. 2, p. 908–922.
 Karl Kautsky, "Imperialism and the War," trans. William E. Bohn, International Socialist Review [Chicago,IL: 1900] 15 (1914); also available at Marxist’s Internet Archive, http://www.marxists.org/archive/kautsky/1914/09/war.htm
 Karl Kautsky, "Ultra-imperialism," trans. unknown, New Left Review I/59 (1970), 41-46; also available at Marxist’s Internet Archive, http://www.marxists.org/archive/kautsky/1914/09/ultra-imp.htm
 V.I. Lenin, Imperialism: The Highest Stage of Capitalism, Russia 1917.
 Holm A. Leonhardt: Bibliographie zur Ultraimperialismus-Theorie. Bibliography on Ultraimperialism Theory. In: Homepage des Instituts für Geschichte der Universität Hildesheim http://www.uni-hildesheim.de/media/geschichte/Bibliographie Ultraimperialismustheorie.pdf.
 Holm A. Leonhardt: Zur Geschichte der Ultraimperialismus-Theorie 1902–1930. Die Ideengeschichte einer frühen Theorie der politischen Globalisierung. In: Homepage des Instituts für Geschichte der Universität Hildesheim http://www.uni-hildesheim.de/media/geschichte/Geschichte Ultraimperialismustheorie.pdf (available since January 20, 2008).
 Martin Thomas: Introduction to Kautsky's "Ultra-imperialism: a debate". in: Workers Liberty 2002, http://www.workersliberty.org/node/1037 "Ultra-imperialism.
 John A. Willoughby: The Lenin-Kautsky Unity-Rivaly Debate, in: Review of Radical Political Economics. Vol. 11, 1979, Issue 4, p. 91–101.

Imperialism studies
Marxist terminology
Management cybernetics